Baworn Tapla (born February 20, 1988), simply known as Worn, is a Thai professional footballer who plays as a midfielder for Thai League 1 club Lamphun Warriors.

External links
 Profile at Goal
http://th.soccerway.com/players/boworn-tapla/329736/

References

1988 births
Living people
Baworn Tapla
Baworn Tapla
Association football midfielders
Baworn Tapla
Baworn Tapla
Baworn Tapla
Baworn Tapla
Baworn Tapla
Baworn Tapla
Baworn Tapla